County routes in Nassau County, New York, are maintained by the Nassau County Department of Public Works and have been unsigned since the 1970s. The designations are largely in alphabetical order. Routes E51 to E68 are listed below; unused route designations are skipped.

County Route E51 

County Route E51 is a 2.15-mile (3.46 km) road between Cedarhurst and Hewlett, known as West Broadway.

CR E51 begins at Rockaway Turnpike (CR 257) in the Incorporated Village of Cedarhurst. It then winds its way through the village, soon reaching Prospect Avenue. It then enters Woodmere, continuing east-northeast to Woodmere Boulevard (CR E68). It then continues east-northeast, entering Hewlett and reaching Mill Road (CR D58), thence crossing the Long Island Rail Road's Far Rockaway Branch and ending at Broadway (CR C22).

History 

In the 1940s, there was a failed proposal to eliminate West Broadway's grade crossing by elevating the Far Rockaway Branch through the area. West Broadway would then pass underneath the tracks.

CR E51 was formerly designated as part of CR 10, prior to the route numbers in Nassau County being altered.

County Route E52 

County Route E52 is a county route designation given to a 0.28-mile (0.45 km) stretch of West Main Street entirely within Oyster Bay.

CR E52 begins at Lexington Avenue (CR D34). It continues east to South Street (NY 106).

West of Lexington Avenue, the road continues west and north to Bayville as CR E54.

CR E52 was formerly designated as part of CR 14, with West Shore Road (CR E54) and Ludlam Avenue (CR D41), prior to the route numbers in Nassau County being altered.

County Route E53 

County Route E53 is a short, 0.06-mile (0.01 km) route designation given to West Powells Lane in Old Westbury.

The route begins at Powells Lane. It then proceeds to and terminates at the South Service Road of the Long Island Expressway (I-495).

County Route E54 

County Route E54 is a 2.44-mile (3.93 km) county route between Oyster Bay and Bayville, via West Shore Road.

CR E54 begins at Lexington Avenue (CR D34) in Oyster Bay. It then proceeds west-northwest to Mill Hill Road, entering the Incorporated Village of Mill Neck. The road then turns north-northwest, crossing underneath the Long Island Rail Road's Oyster Bay Branch and hugs the coastline along Oyster Bay Harbor – which it hugs until reaching the Bayville Bridge. It then continues north along the coastline, soon intersecting Cleft Road, thence continuing north to the Bayville Bridge, which it then crosses. The road then becomes Ludlam Avenue (CR D41) at the Bayville village line, on the north side of the bridge. At the Bayville village line, the CR E54 designation ends, and the road continues north as Ludlam Avenue (CR D41).

History 
CR E54 was formerly designated as part of CR 14, with West Main Street (CR E52) and Ludlam Avenue (CR D41), prior to the route numbers in Nassau County being altered.

In the 1980s, there was a proposal to widen West Shore Road to improve safety – in addition to repairing the seawall paralleling the road. A wide, painted median and a shoulder were proposed as part of the plan. This proposal was complicated by environmental concerns and the fact that the wetlands on the east side of the road being deeded to the Federal Government, as per a 1968 agreement.

Major intersections

County Route E55 

County Route E55 is a short, 0.12-mile (0.19 km) road entirely within the Incorporated Village of Garden City, known as West Street.

CR E55 begins at Fifteenth Street (CR C76). It then continues north for one block, where it intersects with Old Country Road (CR 25), where it terminates. The route, in its entirety, travels north-to-south.

CR E55, in its entirety, was formerly designated as CR 147, prior to the route numbers in Nassau County being altered.

Major intersections

County Route E57 

County Route E57 is a county route split into two connected segments: a 1.86-mile (2.99 km) main road between Mineola and Westbury, known as Westbury Avenue, and a 0.08-mile (0.13 km) spur at its eastern end.

CR E57 begins at Roslyn Road (CR 7A) in Mineola. It then proceeds east, eventually entering Carle Place and intersecting Glen Cove Road (CR 1) shortly thereafter. From there, the road curves southeast briefly and then turns back east, crossing over the Meadowbrook State Parkway and then intersecting Jamaica Avenue. It then continues east, intersecting Cherry Lane, thence continuing east to Maple Avenue, at which point it enters the Incorporated Village of Westbury. It then merges into Maple Avenue (CR D44), at which point the CR E57 designation ends.

CR E57 was formerly designated as part of CR 12, prior to the route numbers in Nassau County being altered.

County Route E58 

County Route E58 is a short, 0.18-mile (0.29 km) section of Westbury Boulevard designated as a county route, located entirely within East Garden City (Uniondale).

CR E58 begins at Oak Street (CR D74). It then continues east to Charles Lindbergh Boulevard (CR C28), where the both road and county route designation end.

West of Oak Street, Westbury Boulevard continues southwest to Bennett Avenue in the Incorporated Village of Hempstead, as a town road within East Garden City/Uniondale, and as a village road within the Incorporated Village of Hempstead.

County Route E59 

County Route E59 is a 0.71-mile (1.14 km) county road entirely within West Hempstead, known as Westminster Road.

CR E59 begins at Hempstead Avenue (CR D09) in West Hempstead. It then proceeds north, intersecting Hempstead Turnpike (NY 24). It then continues north, intersecting Argyle Road. It then continues north to the West Hempstead–Garden City border, where the route designation ends and the name of the street changes to Rockaway Avenue, which continues north from this point as CR E06.

CR E59 was formerly designated as part of CR 84, prior to the route numbers in Nassau County being altered.

County Route E60 

County Route E60 is the designation for the 3.42-mile (5.5 km) section of Wheatley Road owned and maintained by the County of Nassau, between the Incorporated Villages of Old Westbury and Muttontown. 

CR E60 begins at the end of Post Road (CR 4), which is at its intersection with Wheatley Road (which continues southwest from this point as a village road). From this intersection, CR E60 (Wheatley Road) continues northwest before turning northeast, soon intersecting Whitney Lane. It then continues east, entering the Incorporated Village of Brookville, turning northeast and soon intersecting Cedar Swamp Road (NY 107). It then continues northeast before turning north, then entering the Incorporated Village of Muttontown and intersecting Brookville Road. It then continues north to Northern Boulevard (NY 25A), where the route designation ends and the name of the street changes to Wolver Hollow Road (which continues north as CR E65 to the Incorporated Village of Upper Brookville). 

CR E60 was formerly designated as part of CR 4, prior to the route numbers in Nassau County being altered.

County Route E61 

County Route E61 is a short, 0.91-mile (1.46 km) county route between Lynbrook and North Lynbrook, known as Whitehall Street. 

CR E61 begins at Hendrickson Avenue (CR D12) in Lynbrook. It then continues northeast to Grand Avenue. It then continues northeast before turning east, entering North Lynbrook and terminating at Franklin Avenue (CR C83). 

CR E61 was formerly designated as part of CR 173, prior to the route numbers in Nassau County being altered.

County Route E62 

County Route E62 is a short, 0.42-mile (0.68 km) county route entirely within the Incorporated Village of Hempstead, known as William Street. 

CR E62 begins at Jerusalem Avenue (CR 105). It then continues north-northeast to Front Street (NY 102), where it terminates. 

CR E62, in its entirety, was formerly designated as CR 85, prior to the route numbers in Nassau County being altered; the CR 85 is now used as the designation for the portion of East Williston Avenue (NY 25B) owned and maintained by Nassau County; that route was formerly CR 25B.

County Route E63 

County Route E63 is a short, 0.05-mile (0.08 km) county route located entirely within the Incorporated Village of East Rockaway, consisting of the one-block segment of Williamson Street owned and maintained by the County of Nassau. 

CR E63 begins at Fourth Street. It then continues east one block to Fifth Street, where the county route designation ends. 

Major intersections

County Route E64 

County Route E64 is a major, 4.51-mile (7.26 km) north-south county route between the Incorporated Villages of Mineola and Flower Hill, consisting of Mineola Avenue and Willis Avenue. 

CR E64 begins as Willis Avenue at Old Country Road (CR 25) in Mineola. It travels north-northwest underneath the Long Island Rail Road's Main Line and Oyster Bay Branch, then intersecting Second Street (CR E23) shortly thereafter. It then continues and intersects First Street (CR C78) one block to the north-northwest. It then continues straight, eventually intersecting Jericho Turnpike (NY 25). It then continues straight, towards the north-northwest, soon entering the Incorporated Village of Williston Park and intersecting Hillside Avenue (NY 25B). From there, it continues north through Williston Park, passing and crossing the former route of the Long Island Motor Parkway before entering Albertson. Still continuing north, CR E64 soon intersects I. U. Willets Road in Albertson. It then continues north and north-northeast through Albertson, eventually reaching and crossing underneath the Northern State Parkway; Willis Avenue enters Roslyn Heights at this location. It continues north-northeast, soon reaching and crossing underneath the Long Island Expressway (I-495). It then becomes Mineola Avenue and turns northwest through Roslyn Heights, eventually reaching Garden Street, and then reaching Warner Avenue one block north, before reaching Hillside Avenue one block later. From there, CR E64 continues northwest, forming the municipal border between the Incorporated Village of Roslyn and the Incorporated Village of Roslyn Estates, gently meandering its way to Old Northern Boulevard (CR D71) at the Flower Hill–Roslyn–Roslyn Estates tripoint. It then enters the Incorporated Village of Flower Hill, continuing north to Northern Boulevard (NY 25A), where the county route designation terminates. North of this intersection, the road becomes Center Drive, which is a residential street owned and maintained by the Village of Flower Hill.

History 
CR E64 was formerly designated CR 71, prior to the route numbers in Nassau County being altered.

In the 1960s, there was a proposal to link Willis Avenue in Mineola with Hempstead Avenue in West Hempstead, by way of an abandoned Long Island Rail Road right-of-way through Garden City and Hempstead. The proposal was eventually called off due to local opposition.

Major intersections

County Route E65 

County Route E65 is a 1.45-mile county road between the Incorporated Villages of Muttontown and Upper Brookville, known as Wolver Hollow Road. 

CR E65 begins at Northern Boulevard (NY 25A) at the north side of the Muttontown–Upper Brookville border, across the intersection from Wheatley Road (CR E60). It then heads towards the north, eventually intersecting Piping Rock Road (CR D89). It then continues towards the north, winding a bit, before reaching Chicken Valley Road (CR C39), where the road and route designation both end. 

CR E65 was formerly designated as part of CR 4, prior to the route numbers in Nassau County being altered. 

Major intersections

County Route E67 

County Route E67 is a 2.47-mile (3.98 km) road known as Woodfield Road, connecting Lakeview and West Hempstead. 

CR E67 begins at Lakeview Road (CR D28). It then continues towards the north, meandering its way to the Southern State Parkway, which it crosses and enters West Hempstead. From there, it continues towards the north, crosses the Long Island Rail Road's West Hempstead Branch, and soon thereafter intersects Eagle Avenue. It then continues north to Hempstead Avenue (CR D09), where it terminates. 

CR E67 was formerly designated CR 84, prior to the route numbers in Nassau County being altered.

County Route E68 

County Route E68 is a 1.59-mile (2.56 km) road known as Woodmere Boulevard, between Hewlett Neck and Woodmere.

CR E68 begins at Hickory Road in the Incorporated Village of Hewlett Neck. It then travels north thence northwest, intersecting Browers Point Branch Road (CR C25). It continues west-northwest before veering northwest, soon intersecting Barberry Lane and entering the Incorporated Village of Woodsburgh. CR E68 then continues northwest, again intersecting CR C25. It then continues northwest, intersecting Broadway (CR C22) and entering Woodmere. Continuing Northwest, it intersects Central Avenue, then crosses the Long Island Rail Road's Far Rockaway Branch, thence intersecting West Broadway (CR E51) shortly thereafter. It then continues north to its intersection with Peninsula Boulevard (CR 2), where the county route designation for Woodmere Boulevard ends.

CR E68 was formerly designated CR 93, prior to the route numbers in Nassau County being altered.

References 

County routes in Nassau County, New York